Lennart Andersson may refer to:

Lennart Andersson (athlete) (1914–1997), Swedish Olympic triple jumper
Lennart Andersson (rower) (1925–2004), Swedish Olympic rower
Lennart Andersson (sport shooter) (born 1957), Swedish Olympic shooter